The Olentangy Indian Caverns are a series of caves, natural passages and rooms occupying three different levels. The caverns were formed millions of years ago by an underground river that cut through the limestone rock. They were used by the Wyandotte Indians as a refuge from the weather and from their enemies the Delaware Indians. Artifacts found in the caverns indicate that it was used by the Wyandotte as late as 1810. The Olentangy Indian Caverns are located at 1779 Home Road, Delaware, Ohio and are open seasonally for tours.

Recreation 

On the property, a petting zoo, minigolf course, treasure maze, and mock gem mine are offered, as well as a gift shop. A covered picnic area can also be rented out. There is also a museum, which houses artifacts found in and around the caverns.

History 

The caverns were formed millions of years ago by dissolution of limestone from an underground river. The caverns are believed to have been used by the Wyandotte Indians. The Caverns were rediscovered in 1821 by J.M. Adams, a nearby camper, who was a member of a wagon train. He carved his initials in the entrance, where they can still be seen today. The caverns include many openings and passages, and have not been fully explored.

References

External links
 Olentangy Indian Caverns - official site

Caves of Ohio
Landforms of Delaware County, Ohio
Show caves in the United States
Tourist attractions in Delaware County, Ohio
Delaware, Ohio